Together as One may refer to:

 Together as One (Elan Atias album), 2006
 Together as One (Hillsong album)
 Together as One (festival), an electronic music festival